The 2010 Senegalese League Cup (Coupe de la Ligue) was the second ever edition of the League Cup challenge.  The format is like a playoff system and features clubs from the country's top two leagues (Ligue 1 and 2).  AS Douanes won the first title. Five rounds were featured and 32 clubs competed.  The winner competes into the Assemblée Nationale Cup or the National Assembly Cup, the super cup competition in Senegal.

First round or 1/16 final

1/4 final

Quarterfinal

Semifinal

Final
The first ever final match of the League Cup took place.  Casa Sports defeated ASC Diaraf 1-2 and claimed their first title, the second club to win their first title.

External links
the 2010 Senegalese League Cup (Coupe de la Ligue) at RSSSF.com

Football in Senegal
2009 in African association football leagues
2009–10 in Senegalese football